Alan Montgomery Jones  Hon FRIAS Hon AIA (born September 1964) is a chartered architect and academic based in Northern Ireland, UK. He studied architecture at Queen's University Belfast, and after practising in London returned to Northern Ireland in 1998 to practise, and to teach at Queen's University Belfast. He jointly led architecture at Queen's (2008–16) and is currently professor of architecture (education and practice) in its School of Natural and Built Environment.

Jones served as president of the Royal Society of Ulster Architects from May 2012 to 2014. In August 2018 he was elected as president of the Royal Institute of British Architects (RIBA), assuming office on 1 September 2019 for a two-year term. Between 31 March and 15 June 2020, he temporarily stepped back over a matter in his private life. He resumed office on 15 June 2020, and in July 2021 stepped down as a RIBA trustee, but remained as RIBA President, feeling unable to support a proposal to convert the contract of the RIBA chief executive.  

Alan Jones completed his two year presidential term 31st August 2021 and on the 28th April 2022 it was reported by the Architects' Journal  that Alan Vallance, CEO, had handed in his notice and was to leave the RIBA at the end of July 2022, that it was understood the CEO’s salary was £300,000 and that the RIBA’s financial difficulties emerged in its 2020 financial accounts, showing the institute had posted an annual trading budget deficit of £8 million.

Education
Born in September 1964, Jones was educated at the state-funded D H Christie Memorial Primary School (part of The Honourable The Irish Society group of schools), at two state-funded grammar schools, Coleraine Academical Institution and Ballymena Academy, and then, supported by an education grant, at Queen's University Belfast.

Practice
Having previously worked with London-based Michael Hopkins and Partners for seven years, and as an associate with David Morley Architects, Jones returned to Northern Ireland in 1998 to take up private practice as founder and principal of Alan Jones Architects (AJA), and to teach in the School of Architecture at Queen's University Belfast.

At AJA, Jones has realised numerous projects, including the stainless steel-clad farmhouse extension at Cranfield (RIBA award), Straidhavern School, his family home in Randalstown (which received the RSUA design award for residential projects, a RIBA award, and was shortlisted for the RIBA Manser Medal), an office for a coffee importer in Belfast (which received a special mention in the Architectural Association of Ireland awards – the first Northern Ireland project to do so for seven years), and the £4.2M Alley Arts and Conference Centre in Strabane, a joint project by Glenn Howells Architects, Birmingham and AJA (which gained an RSUA award and was shortlisted for a RIBA award).

Jones / AJA work has featured in publications including RIBA Journal, Architects' Journal, Domus (Milan), Wallpaper*, Architecture Today, Blueprint, Vision (Shanghai), Hinge (Hong Kong), and the Sunday Times. The Daily Telegraph listed Jones as one of the UK's "top notch architects". His work has also been included in technical publications, including Birkhauser's Fibre Cement: Technology and Design (2006) and the RIBA Guide to Architectural Insitu Concrete (2007).

Jones also acts as an expert witness on design matters.

Education and research 
From 2008 to 2016, as director of education (architecture), Jones jointly managed and led the subject area of architecture at Queen's University. He was appointed a professor in 2019. He has been invited to be a design critic at the schools of architecture in Delft, Robert Gordon University (then Institute), Cambridge, North London, Bath, and Dublin Institute of Technology and University College Dublin. He was a member of the RIBA Education Committee (2001–2012) and the Architects' Council of Europe Education Working Group (2003–2009). He was a member of the national RIBA Research and Innovation Group and Research Grants Committee from 2010 to 2017. Through over 100 role models, his "Success through Architecture" project documents the diversity of mainstream practice and the "extended profession" within other areas of business and culture. He was a member of the advisory panel, along with Robin Nicholson and others, for the 2015–2017 AHRC-funded research project "The Value of Architecture and Architects".

Professional governance roles
Jones has been a member of the governing council and trustee of the Royal Society of Ulster Architects from 1998 to 2006 and from 2007. He has been an invited judge for RIBA, RSUA and Royal Incorporation of Architects in Scotland awards, including the RIAS Andrew Doolan Award. In May 2012 he became RSUA president for 2012 to 2014. From 2008 to 2016, Jones led architectural education at Queen's University from mid to high rankings in The Guardian league table and first in the 2018 table for added value. He has advised other schools of architecture, and been an external examiner at parts 1 and 2 (Manchester, Dundee and University of Nottingham). In 2018 he was invited to join the executive committee of the Commonwealth Association of Architects, to guide work on equivalence and transferability of professional qualifications across numerous countries.

Jones was elected in a national vote to the RIBA Council in 2015. In September 2015 he received unanimous approval of the council to be vice-president of education for 2015–2017 and again for 2017–2018. In 2016 Jones was a runner-up in the election for president of the RIBA, with 44% of the final vote.

RIBA president 
In August 2018 he was elected as president of the Royal Institute of British Architects (RIBA), with 51.66% of the votes on an 18.97%  election turnout, taking office for an expected two-year term on 1 September 2019. 

While president, Jones appeared on BBC Two's Christmas University Challenge in December 2020, answering one question – incorrectly – for the Queen's, Belfast team.

He completed his two-year term on 31 August 2021, and summed up the time:
"Across my two years as RIBA President, by working closely with Council, Board, staff and the wider membership, we have achieved a great deal....We decided to reorientate the profession, to demonstrate our relevance, our value, and present ourselves as part of the solution to some of society’s toughest challenges. We’ve made a solid start and I am particularly proud of the President’s Fact-Finding Mission, a set of long-term goals and short-term plans, that form the ‘Guiding Star’ of RIBA’s 2034 Masterplan to keep the profession and Institute on track."

RIBA dispute
The Architects’ Journal have reported that in early 2020 complaints by Alan Jones about CEO Alan Vallance were lodged in the weeks before the contents of a serious incident report was leaked to the press in late March of that year.  The report was an initial submission of matters raised by the RIBA Executive prior to an investigation, and the leaks and coverage in the media of the uninvestigated internal matters led to various announcements and coverage in the media. 

On 31 March 2020, he announced he was stepping back temporarily, saying "a matter had arisen" in his personal life. The following day, the RIBA said it had reported Jones to the Charity Commission over an alleged "serious incident." Architects' Journal talked of alleged misuse of RIBA funds to further an extramarital affair, amid newspaper reports that "a woman claiming to be his mistress would reveal embarrassing details of an affair" and police investigations in Northern Ireland. The Times said Jones had also been accused of helping his mistress find a job. Architects' Journal columnist Paul Finch observed the RIBA's "secretariat goes into overdrive, dragging in the Charities Commission [sic]...", and downplayed the matter ("The kerfuffle at Portland Place is a presidential-sized fuss over nothing"), and Archinect expected Jones would serve out his full two year term. On 12 June, Jones gave a public explanation of why he had stepped back, and said he would resume office on 15 June 2020.

However, this episode continued to affect Jones's presidency. On 19 July 2021, just over a month before Jones' presidential term was due to end, Architects' Journal reported that he had resigned as a RIBA board member and trustee due to an ongoing dispute with RIBA's chief executive, Alan Vallance. Jones opposed board moves to renew Vallance's five-year contract from September 2021, having made "serious allegations" about Vallance's conduct in February 2020. RIBA insiders say their difference of opinion relates to different visions for the RIBA, with Jones objecting to the size of Vallance's salary and questioning if a cultural institute should be run by an accountant. Senior figures demanded the body 'come clean' about the "War of the Alans" saying "The RIBA is becoming an increasingly secretive organisation. ... Confidentiality has been weaponised and woe betide anyone who wants to ask difficult questions...."

On 27 July 2021, Architects' Journal reported that, prior to his reinstatement as president in June 2020, Jones had been pressed into several "undertakings". In a memo to the board, Jones explained: "These undertakings prevented me from asking questions, calling people out and raising complaints. In other circles this may well be referred to as a 'gagging order'," continuing: "As a lone individual..., I felt intimidated by this ongoing behaviour." The RIBA disputed the 'gagging order' interpretation and denied attempting to silence Jones. The AJ reported that, during 15 months, hundreds of pages of complaints had been made, prompting six independent investigations, of which two were still continuing. A Council Board Advisory Group had been established, with a QC investigating complaints made against Alan Vallance by Jones and by former board honorary secretary Kerr Robertson, with the investigation expected to conclude in September 2021. Regarding the circumstances that preceded the RIBA contacting the Charity Commission, Robertson said: "Had key information not been withheld from me, I would never have agreed to submit the report to the Charity Commission – and therefore there would have been nothing to leak. Despite all this spin, there is no escaping the fact that five or six complaints first raised beforehand have still not been investigated well over a year later."

After completing his two-year tenure as RIBA president, Jones talked to Architects' Journal in September 2021, revealing that he had come under pressure from senior staff to resign. After taking his leave of absence, he said "there was no reason why the RIBA could not have cleared this matter up quickly", continuing:

"While it was clear within days all of the serious allegations were either untrue or exaggerated, the executive nevertheless continued to press for my immediate resignation. Straight after the board voted to reject those calls and await the outcome of the investigation, all of this was leaked to the press. ... I wasn’t helped by my apology being scripted by RIBA advisers to match the gravity of the leaked exaggerated information."

RIBA's treatment of him had caused him and others distress, Jones said, hoping that the individuals responsible "will be duly held to account". He also felt that "in terms of [RIBA's] transparency and accountability, there is room for improvement. ... While every institution needs to respect confidentiality and comply with GDPR, these cannot be used as reasons to prevent openness about the running of an organisation".  He also confirmed "Over the last 30 years, I've given my all to the RIBA and I will of course continue to give this incredible institute my full support."

Recognition
For his contributions to practice, education, and the profession, Jones was appointed a Fellow of the RIBA in 2017. In March 2016 he also accepted an Honorary Fellowship from the RIAS. Of the projects he was worked on, seven have received RIBA awards and two were shortlisted for the Stirling Prize. In 2019 he was bestowed with honorary membership of the Royal Architectural Institute of Canada and in 2021 with honorary membership of the American Institute of Architects.

Publications
 Toward an architecture: Ulster – Building our own authenticity, with David Brett, Black Square Books, 2008.
 Defining Contemporary Professionalism, co-edited with Rob Hyde, RIBA Publishing, September 2019.
 Studying Architecture Well – "a guide to help current and would-be students of architecture in the UK both to do well during their studies and, importantly, to stay well as they cope with the opportunities, stresses and strains of learning", Jenny Russell, Matt Thompson with Alan Jones, RIBA, 2021.
 Practise Architecture Well – "a free guide is to help freshly qualified and early-career architects both to do well during their career and, importantly, to stay well as they cope with the stresses and strains of being a member of the profession", Jenny Russell, Matt Thompson with Alan Jones, RIBA 2021.

References

External links
 Alan Jones Architects 
 Success Through Architecture

1964 births
People from Derry (city)
People educated at Ballymena Academy
Alumni of Queen's University Belfast
Architects from Northern Ireland
Living people
Presidents of the Royal Institute of British Architects